The Protective Policing Service, operated by the Royal Canadian Mounted Police, provides security details for the members of the Royal Family (when in Canada), the Governor General of the country and the Prime Minister. They also protect the families of the Prime Minister and Governor General, federal cabinet ministers, visiting VIPs, Members of Parliament, and Senators, diplomats, Supreme, Federal Court and Federal Court of Appeal justices, and those designated by the Minister of Public Safety as protected persons.

PPS agents can be recruited from the Canadian Armed Forces and other Police Services, but will be under the umbrella of the RCMP.

History
In October 2022, concerns were raised that the RCMP has not recruited enough officers to provide close protection work, undermining RCMP's capabilities to protect VIPs. 

Under a 2022-23 Departmental Plan, the RCMP PPS will move to a centralized model to provide enhanced oversight/compliance.

Provincial counterparts
Many provinces have a similar organization that is responsible for the protection of the provincial Lieutenant-Governor, the Premier, other members of the provincial cabinet, and members of the judiciary.

 : Alberta Sheriffs Branch
 : British Columbia Sheriff Service
 : Royal Newfoundland Constabulary
 : Ontario Provincial Police
 : Sûreté du Québec

See also
United States Secret Service#Other U.S. federal law enforcement agencies

References

External links
 RCMP Protective Policing website

Protective_Policing
Protective security units
Sky marshals
1970s establishments in Canada